Golden Girl is a 1951 American Musical Western film directed by Lloyd Bacon and starring Mitzi Gaynor, Dale Robertson, Dennis Day and James Barton.

The original song, "Never," written by Lionel Newman and Eliot Daniel, and sung by Dennis Day in the film, earned the film its only Academy Award nomination.

The picture is loosely based on the life of famed entertainer Lotta Crabtree, who was known as "The Golden Girl" (1847–1924).

Plot
In her hometown of Grass Valley, vivacious teenager Lotta Crabtree (Mitzi Gaynor) is thrilled when the famed performer Lola Montez comes to town in 1863. She wants to become a singer like Lola herself someday, although parents Mary Ann (Una Merkel) and John Crabtree (James Barton), who run a boarding house, don't necessarily approve.

Lotta has a couple of admirers, the local boy Mart Taylor (Dennis Day) and a mature newcomer to town, Tom Richmond (Dale Robertson), who is informed that Lotta is only 16. A boarder named Cornelius (Raymond Walburn) with a surefire way to win at roulette lures Lotta's dad into a game, where he loses all of his money plus the boarding house.

Aware of the way Lola Montez made a fortune singing in mining camps for men who can't get to a theater, Lotta sets out on the road to do likewise. The miners like her, but don't throw gold pieces her way until she strips off part of her costume and gives them quite a show.

Lotta's father wins a San Francisco theater in a card game. Lotta becomes a star there, then travels East to perform in New York City. Older and wiser in two years, she learns that Tom has been committing robberies to raise money for the Confederate army in the Civil War.

The war ends, but she sings "Dixie" on stage in New York, to catcalls from the audience. Dennis Day appeases them by saying the victors should be generous to those who have lost. When Lotta became too emotional to sing, Dennis took over. The audience starts to join in until everyone is singing. Tom has been reported near death from an injury, but, at that very minute, he enters the theater to Lotta's delight.

Cast
 Mitzi Gaynor as Lotta Crabtree
 Dale Robertson as Tom Richmond
 Dennis Day as Mart Taylor
 James Barton as John Crabtree
 Una Merkel as Mary Ann Crabtree
 Raymond Walburn as Cornelius
 Gene Sheldon as Sam Jordan
 Carmen D'Antonio as Lola Montez

See also
 List of American films of 1951

References

External links
 
 
 
 

1951 films
1950s biographical films
1951 musical films
1951 Western (genre) films
American Western (genre) musical films
Films directed by Lloyd Bacon
Films scored by Lionel Newman
1950s Western (genre) musical films
American biographical films
20th Century Fox films
Films set in 1863
Cultural depictions of Lola Montez
1950s English-language films
1950s American films